John Thomas Draper (born March 11, 1943), also known as Captain Crunch, Crunch, or Crunchman (after the Cap'n Crunch breakfast cereal mascot), is an American computer programmer and former phone phreak. He is a widely known figure within the computer programming world and the hacker and security community, and generally lives a nomadic lifestyle.

Early life 
Draper is the son of a United States Air Force engineer. As a child, he built a home radio station from discarded military components. He was frequently bullied in school and briefly received psychological treatment.

After taking college courses, Draper enlisted in the U.S. Air Force in 1964. While stationed in Alaska, he helped his fellow service members make free phone calls home by devising access to a local telephone switchboard. In 1967, while stationed at Charleston Air Force Station in Maine, he created WKOS (W-"chaos"), a pirate radio station in nearby Dover-Foxcroft, but shut it down after a legally-licensed radio station, WDME, objected.

Draper was honorably discharged from the Air Force as an Airman First Class in 1968. He moved to Silicon Valley and briefly worked for National Semiconductor as an engineering technician and at Hugle International where he worked on early designs for a cordless telephone. He also attended De Anza College on a part-time basis through 1972.

During this period, he also worked as an engineer and disc jockey for KKUP in Cupertino, California and adopted the countercultural styles of the time by wearing long hair and smoking marijuana.

Career

Phreaking 

While testing a pirate radio transmitter he had built, Draper broadcast a telephone number to listeners seeking feedback to gauge the station's reception. A call from fellow pirate radio operator Denny Teresi resulted in a meeting that led Draper into the world of "phone phreaks", people who study and experiment with telephone networks, and who sometimes use that knowledge to make free calls. Teresi and several other phone phreaks were blind. Learning of Draper's knowledge of electronic design, they asked him to build a multifrequency tone generator, known informally as a blue box, a device for emitting audio tones used to control the phone network. The group had previously used an organ and cassette recordings of tones to make free calls. Among the phone phreaks, one blind boy who had taken the moniker of Joybubbles had perfect pitch and was able to identify frequencies precisely.

Draper learned that a toy whistle packaged in boxes of Cap'n Crunch cereal emitted a tone at precisely 2600 hertz—the same frequency that AT&T long lines used to indicate that a trunk line was available for routing a new call. The tone disconnected one end of the trunk while the still-connected side entered an operator mode. The vulnerability they had exploited was limited to call-routing switches that relied on in-band signaling. After 1980 and the introduction of Signalling System No. 7 most U.S. phone lines relied almost exclusively on out-of-band signaling. This change rendered the toy whistles and blue boxes useless for phreaking purposes. The whistles are considered collectible souvenirs of a bygone era, and the magazine 2600: The Hacker Quarterly is named after the audio frequency.

Profile by Esquire
In 1971, journalist Ron Rosenbaum wrote about phone phreaking for Esquire. The article relied heavily on interviews with Draper and conferred upon him a sort of celebrity status among people interested in the counterculture. When first contacted by Rosenbaum about the story, Draper was ambivalent about being interviewed, but also in the same breath explained his prevailing ethos:

The notoriety from the article led to Draper's arrest in 1972 on charges of toll fraud, for which he was sentenced to five years' probation. However, it also caught the attention of University of California, Berkeley engineering student and future Apple co-founder Steve Wozniak, who located Draper while working as an engineer at the radio station KKUP. Wozniak and Draper met to compare techniques for building blue boxes. Also present was Wozniak's friend Steve Jobs. Wozniak and Jobs later set up a small business selling blue boxes.

Hardware and software developer

Apple Computer
In 1977, Draper worked for Apple as an independent contractor, and was assigned by Wozniak to develop a device that could connect the Apple II computer to phone lines. Wozniak said he thought computers could act like an answering machine, and modems were not yet widely available. Draper designed an interface device dubbed the "Charlie Board," which was designed to dial toll-free telephone numbers used by many corporations, and to emit touch-tones that would grant access to the WATS lines in use by those companies. In theory, this would allow unlimited and free long-distance phone calls. "It was an incredible board. But no one at Apple liked Crunch. Only me. They wouldn't let his device become a product," Wozniak said of the episode. Some of its techniques would later be used in tone-activated calling menus, voicemail, and other services.

Easywriter 
In 1976 and 1978, Draper served two prison sentences for phone fraud. While on a work-release program during a third period of incarceration in 1979, Draper wrote EasyWriter, the first word processor for the Apple II. Draper later ported EasyWriter to the IBM PC, and it was selected by IBM as the machine's official word processor, beating competing bids from Microsoft. Draper formed a software company called Capn' Software, but it booked less than $1 million in revenue over six years. Distributor Bill Baker also hired other programmers to create a follow-up program, Easywriter II, without Draper's knowledge. Draper sued and the case was later settled out-of-court.

Autodesk and other ventures 
Draper joined Autodesk in 1986, designing video driver software in a role offered to him directly by co-founder John Walker. In 1987, Draper was charged in a scheme to forge tickets for the Bay Area Rapid Transit system. He pled guilty to lesser misdemeanor charges in 1988 and entered a diversion program. While facing prosecution, he remained on the Autodesk payroll but did no work for the company. Autodesk fired Draper in 1989.

From 1999 to 2004, Draper was the Chief Technical Officer (CTO) for ShopIP, a computer security firm that designed The Crunchbox GE, a firewall device running OpenBSD. Despite endorsements from Wozniak, and publicity from media profiles, the product failed to achieve commercial success.

In 2007, Draper was named Chief Technology Officer (CTO) at En2go, a software company that developed media delivery tools. The company had previously been named Medusa Style Corp. It is unclear when Draper's involvement in the company ceased; however, filings with the U.S. Securities and Exchange Commission document the resignations of several of its officers (including Wozniak) during the summer of 2009. En2Go never achieved commercial success.

Allegations of sexually inappropriate behavior 
In 2017, organizers of at least four hacking and security-related conferences (including DEF CON, HOPE, and ToorCon) said they had banned Draper from attending in the wake of allegations against him concerning unwanted sexual attention toward other attendees. The allegations were reported in two stories by BuzzFeed News.

Further allegations against Draper emerged in reporting by The Parallax. In the story, University of Pennsylvania computer science professor Matt Blaze asserted that Draper subjected him to a stalking campaign in the 1970s when he was a teenager and when Draper would have been in his thirties. Additionally, journalist Phil Lapsley alleged that Draper consented to an interview in exchange for a partially clothed piggyback ride.

Following reports of the allegations, Draper said that he has Asperger syndrome, which he said could have contributed to his behavior. He denied some of the allegations in an interview with The Daily Dot and did not answer others. He denied any explicit sexual intent and instead described the encounters as an "energy workout" employing techniques of applied kinesiology, a discredited form of alternative medicine of which he claims to be an advocate. Draper conceded that in some instances he may have experienced an erection during the encounters which allegedly included massages of the leg and arm muscles as well as squats and pushups while carrying Draper's bodyweight.

Describing one such workout with Draper in an authorized biography, writer Craig Wilson Fraser wrote: "The first time I tried it, my drug-fueled paranoia went through the roof that it was about to turn sexual in some way, but of course nothing of that nature ever occurred."

Portrayal 	
In scenes depicting his interactions with Wozniak and Jobs, Draper was portrayed by the actor Wayne Pére in the 1999 made-for-TV film Pirates of Silicon Valley.

References 

1943 births
Living people
20th-century American criminals
American people convicted of fraud
Phreaking
Apple Inc. employees
American computer programmers
United States Air Force airmen
Berkeley Macintosh Users Group members
People with Asperger syndrome